The following is a list of episodes of 100 Deeds for Eddie McDowd, a television series that ran on Nickelodeon from October 16, 1999 to April 21, 2002.

Series overview

Episodes

Season 1 (1999–2000)

Season 2 (2001)

Season 3 (2002)

References

External links 

Lists of American sitcom episodes
Lists of Canadian sitcom episodes
Lists of American teen comedy television series episodes
Lists of Nickelodeon television series episodes